Sean Christopher Mahan (born May 28, 1980) is a former American football center. He was drafted by the Tampa Bay Buccaneers in the fifth round of the 2003 NFL Draft. He played college football at Notre Dame.

Mahan was also a member of the Pittsburgh Steelers.

Early years
Born in Tulsa, Mahan attended Jenks High School of Jenks, Oklahoma and graduated in 1998. He led the football team to four conference titles and three regional titles; he was also a two-time All-City and All-Conference selection. As a senior, Mahan was team captain and MVP.

College career
Mahan played college football at the University of Notre Dame and started 25 of 41 games played from the 1999 to 2002 seasons after redshirting in 1998. With the Notre Dame Fighting Irish football team, Mahan played as center, tackle, and guard. He majored in psychology. Mahan played under head coach Bob Davie from 1999 to 2001 and Tyrone Willingham in 2002.

Professional career

NFL Draft

Mahan was selected by the Tampa Bay Buccaneers in the first round (1 th overall) in the 2003 NFL Draft and was one of four Notre Dame offensive linemen drafted that year.

First stint with Tampa Bay Buccaneers (2003–2006)
In his rookie year, Mahan wore jersey number 78 and made most of his appearances on special teams.  Mahan made his NFL debut at the Atlanta Falcons on September 21. In 2004, Mahan wore jersey number 79 and took over as center for the injured John Wade. The offensive line weakened in 2004; by late November, the line allowed 27 sacks, 4 more than the 2003 total of 23.  Throughout the next three seasons, Mahan played in every single game for the Buccaneers and in 2005 was part of the offensive line that helped Cadillac Williams to the NFL Rookie of the Year.

Pittsburgh Steelers (2007)
On March 10, 2007, Mahan signed with the Pittsburgh Steelers to a five-year, $17 million deal. Mahan started all 16 regular season games and the AFC Wild Card game.

Second stint with Tampa Bay Buccaneers (2008–2009)
After a disappointing year at center for the Steelers, and the signing of free agent Justin Hartwig, on September 2, 2008, Mahan was traded back to the Tampa Bay Buccaneers for a 7th round 2009 NFL Draft pick. He was informed of his release on September 2, 2009. He was re-signed on September 14. He was released again on October 27.

References

External links
 Steelers Player Bio

1980 births
Living people
Sportspeople from Tulsa, Oklahoma
Players of American football from Oklahoma
American football centers
American football offensive guards
Notre Dame Fighting Irish football players
Tampa Bay Buccaneers players
Pittsburgh Steelers players
People from Jenks, Oklahoma